Édouard-Léon Scott de Martinville (25 April 1817 – 26 April 1879) was a French printer, bookseller and inventor.

He invented the earliest known sound recording device, the phonautograph, which was patented in France on 25 March 1857.

Early years 
Scott de Martinville was of Scottish descent. His ancestors came from Scotland and moved to Brittany in the seventeenth century. As a printer by trade, he was able to read accounts of the latest scientific discoveries and became an inventor. Scott de Martinville was interested in recording the sound of human speech in a way similar to that achieved by the then-new technology of photography for light and image. He hoped for a form of stenography that could record the whole of a conversation without any omissions. His earliest interest was in an improved form of stenography, and he was the author of several papers on shorthand and a history of the subject (1849).

He was married twice and had six children.

Phonautograph 

From 1853, he became fascinated in a mechanical means of transcribing vocal sounds. While proofreading some engravings for a physics textbook, he came across drawings of auditory anatomy. He sought to mimic the working in a mechanical device, substituting an elastic membrane for the tympanum, a series of levers for the ossicle, which moved a stylus he proposed would press on a paper, wood, or glass surface covered in lampblack. On 26 January 1857, he delivered his design in a sealed envelope to the Académie Française. On 25 March 1857, he received French patent #17,897/31,470 for the phonautograph.

To collect sound, the phonautograph used a horn attached to a diaphragm which vibrated a stiff bristle which inscribed an image on a lampblack-coated, hand-cranked cylinder. Scott built several devices with the help of acoustic instrument maker Rudolph Koenig. Unlike Thomas Edison's later invention of 1877, the phonograph, the phonautograph created only visual images of the sound and did not have the ability to play back its recordings. Scott de Martinville's intention was for the device's waves to be read by humans as one would read text, which proved unfeasible.

Scott de Martinville managed to sell several phonautographs to scientific laboratories for use in the investigation of sound. It proved useful in the study of vowel sounds and was used by Franciscus Donders, Heinrich Schneebeli and Rene Marage. It also initiated further research into tools able to image sound, such as Koenig's manometric flame. He was not, however, able to profit from his invention, and spent the remainder of his life as a bookseller dealing in prints and photographs, at 9 Rue Vivienne in Paris.

Scott de Martinville also became interested in the relationship between linguistics, people's names and their character, and published a paper on the subject (1857).

Rediscovery of the Au clair de la lune recording 

In 2008, The New York Times reported the playback of a phonautogram recorded on 9 April 1860. The recording was converted from "squiggles on paper" to a playable digital audio file with the IRENE technology, developed by scientists at the Lawrence Berkeley National Laboratory in Berkeley, California. The phonautogram was one of several deposited by Léon Scott in two archives in Paris and only recently brought to light.

The recording, part of the French folk song Au clair de la lune, was initially played at a speed that produced what seemed to be a 10-second recording of the voice of a woman or child singing at an ordinary musical tempo. The researchers leading the project later found that a misunderstanding about an included reference frequency had resulted in a doubling of the correct playback speed, and that it was actually a 20-second recording of a man, probably Scott himself, singing the song very slowly. It is now the earliest known recording of singing in existence, predating, by 28 years, several 1888 Edison wax cylinder phonograph recordings of a massed chorus performing Handel's oratorio Israel in Egypt.

Additional recordings 

A phonautogram by Scott containing the opening lines of Torquato Tasso's pastoral drama Aminta, which is the earliest audible record of spoken Italian, has also been found. Recorded around 1860, probably after the recording of Au clair de la lune, this phonautogram is now the earliest known recording of intelligible human speech. Recordings of Scott's voice made in 1857 have also survived, but they are only unintelligible snippets. However, since then one of these recordings (1857 cornet scale recording) has been restored, and earlier records from 1853 experiments have been found and conserved.

Scott's phonautograms were selected by the Library of Congress as a 2010 addition to the National Recording Registry, which selects recordings annually that are "culturally, historically, or aesthetically significant".

Abraham Lincoln recording myth 
It has been claimed that in 1863, Scott's phonautograph was used to make a recording of Abraham Lincoln's voice at the White House. A phonautogram of Lincoln's voice was supposedly among the artifacts kept by Thomas Edison. According to FirstSounds.org, these stories are variations of a myth that likely first appeared in print in a 1969 book about antique collecting, in which the Lincoln recording is explicitly categorized as a legend and dismissed as based on "garbled accounts". There is no solid evidence that such a recording ever existed. Scott did not visit the US in the 1860s and therefore could not have recorded Lincoln himself, as one version of the legend claims he did.

Publications 
  (1847)
  (1849)
  (1857)
  (1857)
 
  (1870)
  (1878)

References

Further reading 
 Helmholtz, Hermann. On the Sensations of Tone as a Physiological Basis for the Theory of Music. Translated by Alexander J. Ellis. London: Longmans, Green, 1875, p. 20.
 History of the Phonautograph Marco, Guy A., editor. Encyclopedia of Recorded Sound in the United States. New York: Garland, 1993, p. 615.
 Winston, Brian. Media Technology and Society: a History from the Telegraph to the Internet. New York : Routledge, 1998.

External links 
 FirstSounds.org, including The Phonautographic Manuscripts of Édouard-Léon Scott de Martinville

1817 births
1879 deaths
19th-century French businesspeople
19th-century French inventors
French people of Scottish descent
People from Paris
French booksellers
French printers